The Woodbine Oaks is a Canadian Thoroughbred horse race run annually at Woodbine Racetrack in Toronto, Ontario. Inaugurated in 1956, it is the premier event for Canadian-foaled three-year-old fillies and the first leg of the Canadian Triple Tiara series.

Raced over a distance of  miles on Polytrack synthetic dirt, the Woodbine Oaks is currently sponsored by Budweiser and currently offers a purse of $391,200.

First run at  miles, since 1959 the distance has been set at  miles. Originally called the Canadian Oaks, in 2001 it was changed to the Labatt Woodbine Oaks, and then to the Woodbine Oaks presented by Budweiser in 2008.

Records
Speed  record:
 1:48.80 - Square Angel (1973) (at current  miles)
 1:45.80 - Yummy Mummy (1958) (at   miles)

Largest margin of victory:
 13 lengths - Avowal (1982)

Most wins by a jockey:
 8 - Sandy Hawley (1970, 1971, 1972, 1973, 1974, 1979, 1988, 1990)

Most wins by a trainer:
 5 - James E. Day (1984, 1988, 1990, 1991, 2003)

Most wins by an owner:
 7 - Sam-Son Farm (1984, 1988, 1990, 1991, 2000, 2001, 2004)

Winners

References
 The Woodbine Oaks official website

Specific

Restricted stakes races in Canada
Flat horse races for three-year-old fillies
Woodbine Racetrack
Recurring sporting events established in 1956
1956 establishments in Ontario
Summer events in Canada